Căpriana monastery is one of the oldest monasteries  of Moldova, located in Căpriana, 40 km (25 miles) north-west of Chișinău.

Overview 
Established in medieval Moldavia, Căpriana is situated in a picturesque forested area once called Codrii Lăpușnei.

The first significant reference dates from a document issued in 1429 that gave Căpriana the status of royal monastery on behalf of Alexander the Good. In this deed the holy abode was referred to as "mănăstirea de la Vâșnovăț unde este egumen Chiprian" (the monastery of Vâșnovăț where the hegumen is Chiprian) and was given in the possession of Alexander's wife - princess Marena.

After a period of decay, the monastery was rebuilt at the behest of Petru Rareș, from 1542 to 1545.

Churches
There are three churches on the monastery site. The Church of the Dormition (a stone summer church) is the oldest extant church in Moldova. The winter church of St George is a twentieth century building. The nineteenth century church is dedicated to St Nicholas. The Church of the Dormition contains the tomb of Metropolitan Gavril Bănulescu-Bodoni.

Gallery

References

External links

 Virtual tour, Visit.md
 Capriana, Monasteries of Moldova
 "Mănăstirea Căpriana", at molddata.md
 Tudor Cires and Simona Lazar, "Tovarăşe părinte, evacuaţi mănăstirea!", Jurnalul Naţional, June 30, 2007, accessed December 20, 2007
 "Panoramas of Căpriana monastery", at panorama.md
 "HDR Photos of Căpriana monastery"

Christian monasteries established in the 15th century
Churches established by Stephen the Great
Christian monasteries in Moldova
Churches in Moldova
Religious buildings and structures in Moldova